Abdulhadi Al-Harajin (born October 27, 1994) is a Saudi footballer who plays as a midfielder for Al-Hazem.

Honours
Al-Hazem
MS League: 2020–21

External links

References

1994 births
Living people
Saudi Arabian footballers
Hajer FC players
Al-Jabalain FC players
Khaleej FC players
Al-Hazem F.C. players
Association football midfielders
Saudi First Division League players
Saudi Professional League players